Willem Nico Potma (born 12 March 1969 in Sneek) is a sailor from the Netherlands, who represented his country at the 1992 Summer Olympics in Barcelona. Potma as helmsman in the Dutch Flying Dutchman with his brother Gerhard Potma as crew took the 18th place. In 1996 Potma returned to the Olympics in Savannah. Again with his brother and Frank Hettinga as crew. Potma took 15th place in the Soling.

Professional life
Potma has an education in retail business. He now works as a self-employed sailmaker.

References

Living people
1969 births
People from Sneek
Sportspeople from Friesland
Dutch male sailors (sport)
Sailors at the 1992 Summer Olympics – Flying Dutchman
Sailors at the 1996 Summer Olympics – Soling
Olympic sailors of the Netherlands
Sailmakers